Mandangad taluka is a taluka in Ratnagiri district of Maharashtra an Indian state.

Ratnagiri district
There are nine talukas in Ratnagiri district, they are Ratnagiri, Rajapur, Lanja, Sangmeshwar, Chiplun, Guhagar, Khed, Dapoli and Mandangad.

See also
Devhare

References

Talukas in Ratnagiri district